The European Go Federation (EGF) is a non-profit organization with the purpose of encouraging, regulating, co-ordinating, and disseminating the playing of the board game Go in Europe. The EGF was founded in 1957, the same year that the inaugural European Go Congress (EGC) took place in Cuxhaven, Germany.  The Congress has been an annual event every year since then, held each time in a different European city. The European Go Championship takes place during the EGC, as well as the Annual General Meeting (AGM). In 2014, the European Professional System was established by the European Go Federation.

Membership is open to any Go-organising association in a country in or near Europe. There are currently 35 full members, and two suspended members.

Function 
The EGF elects an Executive Committee which supervises a number of commissions in charge of normal activities in between the AGMs.

Major European tournaments do not fall under the Executive Committee's supervision, but are directly co-ordinated by the EGF itself. Major events organised by the EGF include the European Grand Prix; the Pandanet European Team Championship; European Youth Go Championships in three age categories; the European Youth Team Championship; the European Pair Go Championship, the European Women's Championship; the European Student Championship and the European Championship, held during the annual European Go Congress. An official Rating List is maintained by processing the results of as many European tournaments as possible.

The European Go Federation is a member of the International Go Federation.

Members 

Note: On the 3rd March 2022, the EGF decided during an emergency general meeting to suspend indefinitely both the Russian and Belorussian Associations due to the 2022 Invasion of Ukraine by Russia. All planned or future events organised by the EGF were cancelled and players from both countries were banned from representing their nations at European events. The first major event affected was the 2022 European Youth Go Championship held between the 10 and 12 March in Czechia.

EGF Professional players
The EGF established a professional system in 2014 with Chinese sponsorship. Top European players are invited to take part in a Qualification Tournament, with one or two of the most successful competitors being awarded professional status. Professionals can then be promoted by earning points from wins against other professional players in major tournaments. As of 2021, there are eight such players, who enjoy benefits including automatic qualification to the Grand Slam and the opportunity to represent Europe in major international tournaments.

Current title holders 
Below is a summary of the current holders or most recent winners of the major EGF-organised events.

See also

 Nihon Ki-in (Japanese Go Association)
 Hanguk Kiwon (Korean Go Association)
 Zhongguo Qiyuan (Chinese Go Association)
 Taiwan Chi-Yuan (Taiwanese Go Association)
 American Go Association
 List of Go organizations

References

External links
 Official site
 Pandanet Go European Cup
 Sensei's Library (an online Go library)

Go organizations
Sports organizations of Europe